The Central Connecticut Conference (CCC) is an interscholastic athletic conference in the Greater Hartford region of Connecticut, United States.

History
In July 1999 founding member Enfield High school would leave the CCC Conference to join the NCCC. E.O. Smith applied to join the CCC Conference in 1999 due to increasing enrollment, E.O. Smith would replace the departing Enfield high school. The Central Connecticut Conference or (CCC) went through major expansion in 2009 with a total of 32 schools participating in the conference. In the 2015–16 school year, Avon High School joined the CCC. This made the conference change back to three divisions of eleven teams, with a blue and a white section in each division, with one having five teams and the other having six. Avon High School moved from the NCCC, where they were the largest school. Some of their competitors were not large enough to have freshman and/or junior varsity teams for Avon to compete against, leading to their move. Avon High school would be replacing Fermi High School which closed its doors at the end of the 2016 academic year, Fermi would merge all of its sports with Enfield High school becoming one school. Also in 2016 Weaver High School a founding member of the CCC Conference in 1984, announced they would be leaving the conference at the end of the 2016-2017 academic year due to low student enrollment. More expansion continued in 2018 when Lewis Mills high school voted to leave the Berkshire league and join the CCC conference beginning conference play in 2019. Lewis Mills would be replacing Rockville high school who left to join the NCCC Conference for the 2017-2018 season.

Membership

North

South

East

West

Former members

State Championships

 Championships since the formation of the conference in 1984

References

External links
 

Education in Connecticut
High school sports conferences and leagues in the United States
Sports in Connecticut
Education in Hartford County, Connecticut
Education in Tolland County, Connecticut